Hindu Temple and Cultural Center of Iowa is a Hindu Temple located in Madrid, Iowa. It is the first Hindu temple to be built in Iowa.

History
The temple was first conceived of in the late 1990s by local Hindus in the Madrid area. The Suhai family raised the initial 25,000 dollars and eventually the Hindu community managed to raise over 1.2 million dollars. By June 2005, they finished constructing the temple.

References

2005 establishments in Iowa
 Buildings and structures in Boone County, Iowa
Hindu temples in the United States
Religious buildings and structures in Iowa
Religious buildings and structures completed in 2005
Indian-American culture in Iowa
Asian-American culture in Iowa